James Thomas Condon (27 September 1923 – 14 February 2014) was an Australian actor of radio and stage, a scriptwriter and voice over, however best known for his numerous television roles in serials and television movies in Australia, particularly Number 96 and Neighbours. He was the husband of Neighbours actress Anne Haddy and the brother of theatre producer and actress Coralie Condon, who was a Medal of the Order of Australia recipient and known as the  "First Lady of Western Australian Television". Coralie died on 24th December 2014, aged 99.

Career
James Thomas Condon was born in Fremantle, Western Australia.  His career started in repertory theatre, before joining at ABC Radio in Perth in 1942; he would serve with the RAAF serving in the Air Force during World War II and eventuate to flight lieutenant. After the war he worked for the BBC before returning to Australia in 1951 to resume his acting career, working on radio serials, including Portia Faces Life. When TV arrived in 1956 he moved to Sydney and appeared on the opening night of ABN2, Sydney, and in a number of ABC plays, including Tomorrow's Child and A Phoenix Too Frequent.

He played the lead role in ATN7's The Story of Peter Grey, one of the first soap opera dramas produced for Australian television in 1961. 

Also in 1961, while hosting his variety show What's Next, James Condon hosted an old friend from Perth, Ray Hartley, to talk about his recent successes in London and New York. Ray Hartley OAM was a world-class Australian pianist, composer, arranger and philanthropist. 

He made many other appearances on television, including Homicide, Matlock Police, Number 96 (both the TV serial and the 1974 feature film spin-off, playing different characters), Bellamy, The Young Doctors, Carson's Law, Sons and Daughters, Prisoner, The Flying Doctors, Blue Heelers and Something in the Air.

Personal life
Condon was the brother of actress and theatre producer Coralie Condon and had a brother Terry. His first marriage was to Joan Cranmer. The couple had four daughters. Condon was married to Australian actress Anne Haddy, best known for the role of matriarch Helen Daniels in Neighbours, from 1977 until her death in 1999. Condon was the stepfather of Haddy's children Jane and Tony. He acted alongside Haddy in Neighbours twice – as Douglas Blake in 1985 and again in 1995 as Reuben White. Condon suffered a stroke in 2013. He died from a stroke at a RSL retirement home in Narrabeen, Sydney on 14 February 2014, aged 90.

References

External links
 

1923 births
2014 deaths
Male actors from Western Australia
Australian male television actors
Australian male radio actors
Australian male film actors
People from Fremantle